Harold L. Moses is the Ingram Professor of Cancer Research, Professor of Cancer Biology, Medicine and Pathology, and director emeritus at the Vanderbilt-Ingram Cancer Center. He was president of the American Association for Cancer Research in 1991.

Career 

Moses graduated from Berea College in 1958 and from Vanderbilt University School of Medicine in 1962 with an MD. He completed his residency at Vanderbilt and did a postdoctoral fellowship at the National Institutes of Health. He then served as a faculty member at Vanderbilt for five years and then at the Mayo Clinic for twelve, where he was the chair of the department of cell biology. He returned to Vanderbilt where he was the chair of cell biology and the founding director of the Vanderbilt Cancer Center. He stepped down as director in 2004.

Research 
Moses' research focuses on TGF beta in cancer.

Awards 
 1991 Rous-Whipple Award, American Association of Pathologists
 2003 Elected Member, Institute of Medicine
 2003-2005 President, Association of American Cancer Institutes
 2009 T J Martell Foundation Lifetime Medical Research Award
 2010 T J Martell Foundation Lifetime Scientific Achievement Award
 2013 Fellow of the AACR Academy
 2013 Lifetime Achievement Award, American Association for Cancer Research
 2016 Elected Fellow, National Academy of Inventors

References 

Year of birth missing (living people)
Living people
Fellows of the AACR Academy
Vanderbilt University alumni
Vanderbilt University faculty
Members of the National Academy of Medicine